The 14th Special Forces Division is a division of the Syrian Armed Forces specializing in light infantry operations.

Role
Syrians use the term 'Special Forces' to describe the 14th, 15th divisions, as well as the independent 'special forces' regiments, but they more closely resemble conventional light infantry units, than Western Special Forces in both mission and composition.

The term Special Forces has been applied ostensibly because of their specialized training in airborne and air assault
operations, but they should be regarded as light infantry forces and elite only in relation to the conventional armored and mechanized brigades of the Syrian Army.

History
Women special military forces from the Defense Companies in the '70s and early '80s ate live snakes as part of their training while children being trained in paramilitary activities were trained to stab live puppies to death. Syrian special forces also ate live scorpions, live snakes, and live puppies during training. Syrian soldiers are also trained to handle vipers.

The 14th Special Forces Division was established to command three Special Forces Regiments after the mid 1990s restructuring of Ali Haydar’s consolidated Special Forces Command.

Haydar's Special Forces expanded in size to 25,000 men, and formed a key part of the Syrian government's security apparatus. The Special Forces were trained in airborne operations, and were rivaled on power only by the Defense Companies controlled by Hafez's brother, Rifaat. As such, the 14th Division became a strong counter-weight to the Defense Companies, as both these formations were largely airborne divisions.

Traditionally they are recruited from the Alawite sect to ensure loyalty to the government. Intelligence sources state it is likely that such units are involved in crushing popular dissent and neutralizing ringleaders.

Syrian occupation of Lebanon
Under Haydar, the Special Forces units were deployed to Lebanon as part of the Syrian intervention in the Lebanese Civil War. During the war they engaged with PLO units under the command of Yasser Arafat.

Syrian Civil War
The government committed much of the 14th Special Forces Division to the assault of Homs, in which it fought some of the strongest rebel positions of Homs’ southwest Baba Amr, Inshaat, and Jobar neighborhoods.

Opposition reports specifically cited activity from the 556th Special Forces Regiment, but most frequently cited the 14th Special Forces Division generally. Activity was reported in different parts of the city during similar time-frames, suggesting that at least one additional regiment from the 14th Special Forces was involved in the Homs operation.

See also
15th Special Forces Division
Al-Assad family
4th Armored Division
Republican Guard

References

Divisions of Syria
Military units and formations established in the 1990s
Special forces units and formations
Special forces of Syria
Damascus